Mirsad Fazlagić (born 4 April 1943) is a Bosnian retired professional footballer and manager, considered one of the best full-backs of his generation.

Club career
Fazlagić started his football career in the youth setup of his local hometown team Čapljina in 1957. As a talented seventeen year old, he was acquired by Yugoslav First League side FK Željezničar, where he also made his debut in the top tier of Yugoslav football. After one season with the blues he made a switch to bitter city rivals FK Sarajevo in the summer of 1960. The team led by prolific scorer Asim Ferhatović finished fourth in the league during the 1963–64 season, with Fazlagić establishing himself as the team's starting right-back. Two years later the maroon-whites finished runners-up behind FK Partizan and eventually went on to win the league during the 1966–67 season, with him captaining the outfit. FK Sarajevo was narrowly beaten by Manchester United in the 1967–68 European Cup second round, despite hosting a goalless draw in the first leg. The second leg played at Old Trafford ended in controversy after the ball went out of bounds prior to the hosts scoring the winning goal. After signing a pre-contract with Juventus in the fall of 1971, which would have made him the most expensive defender in history until that point, he suffered a horrendous knee injury and the transfer fell through. After recovering for nearly a year, he was again fielded by then-FK Sarajevo manager Srboljub Markušević. He retired prematurely in 1975 having played 404 matches for FK Sarajevo while finding the back of the net 10 times. His farewell match for the club was against Sporting CP at the Stadium Koševo, a 2–2 draw.

International career

On the international stage, Fazlagić made 19 appearances for Yugoslavia, earning his first cap in a European Championship qualification match on 31 March 1963 against Belgium (1–0). He is especially known internationally for being the captain of Yugoslavia during the 1968 European Football Championship, where the side took silver after a tight loss to the home team Italy after a two-legged final at the Stadio Olimpico in Rome. He was named part of the tournament's All-star team. He also took part in the 1964 Summer Olympics. His final international was that June 1968 final loss against Italy.

Managerial career
In 1974, Fazlagić was named player-manager of FK Sarajevo, which he led for one season, eventually being transferred to the club's youth department in order to gain more coaching experience. After eight years of managing the youth teams, he was named assistant manager to former club and international teammate Boško Antić. The pair led a talented team of youngsters, including the likes of Faruk Hadžibegić, Husref Musemić, Slaviša Vukičević, Predrag Pašić and Zijad Švrakić, to the Yugoslav First League title in 1985, thus becoming champions both as players and as managers. In 1986, he was named assistant to Mirko Jozić in the Yugoslavia under-20 team, taking the side to the 1987 FIFA World Youth Championship in Chile. The team, fielding many future European stars including Zvonimir Boban, Robert Prosinečki, Davor Šuker and Predrag Mijatović, lifted the trophy. In 1988, he had a brief stint in Melbourne, Australia with Footscray JUST in the National Soccer League. From 1989 to 1990, he also managed Anorthosis Famagusta FC in the Cypriot First Division. With the start of the Bosnian war and the Siege of Sarajevo in 1992, Fazlagić rejoined FK Sarajevo and took part in the club's famous 1993–94 World tour, with the goal of garnering support and international aid for the newly independent state. After the end of the war he worked as a manager in Kuwait.

Personal life
His son-in-law, Mirza Varešanović is a former Bosnia and Herzegovina international player and current manager.

Honours

Player
Sarajevo 
Yugoslav First League: 1966–67

International
Yugoslavia 
UEFA European Championship runner-up: 1968

Individual
Awards 
UEFA Euro Team of the Tournament: 1968

As assistant manager
Sarajevo 
Yugoslav First League: 1984–85

Yugoslavia Youth 
FIFA World Youth Championship: 1987

See also
Awarded the Sixth April Award of Sarajevo in 2016.

References

External links

Serbian national football team website 
Mirsad Fazlagić profile at soccerway.com

1943 births
Living people
People from Čapljina
Bosniaks of Bosnia and Herzegovina
Association football fullbacks
Yugoslav footballers
Yugoslavia international footballers
Olympic footballers of Yugoslavia
Footballers at the 1964 Summer Olympics
UEFA Euro 1968 players
HNK Čapljina players
FK Željezničar Sarajevo players
FK Sarajevo players
Yugoslav Second League players
Yugoslav First League players
Yugoslav football managers
Yugoslav First League managers
FK Sarajevo managers
Anorthosis Famagusta F.C. managers
Bosnia and Herzegovina football managers
Al Tadhamon SC managers
Yugoslav expatriate football managers
Expatriate soccer managers in Australia
Yugoslav expatriate sportspeople in Australia
Expatriate football managers in Cyprus
Yugoslav expatriate sportspeople in Cyprus
Bosnia and Herzegovina expatriate football managers
Expatriate football managers in Kuwait
Bosnia and Herzegovina expatriate sportspeople in Kuwait
Kuwait Premier League managers